Bretea Mureșană was a Dacian fortified town.

References

Dacian fortresses in Hunedoara County
Historic monuments in Hunedoara County